In computer vision and image processing, Otsu's method, named after , is used to perform automatic image thresholding. In the simplest form, the algorithm returns a single intensity threshold that separate pixels into two classes, foreground and background. This threshold is determined by minimizing intra-class intensity variance, or equivalently, by maximizing inter-class variance. Otsu's method is a one-dimensional discrete analogue of Fisher's Discriminant Analysis, is related to Jenks optimization method, and is equivalent to a globally optimal k-means performed on the intensity histogram. The extension to multi-level thresholding was described in the original paper, and computationally efficient implementations have since been proposed.

Otsu's method

The algorithm exhaustively searches for the threshold that minimizes the intra-class variance, defined as a weighted sum of variances of the two classes:

The class probability  is computed from the  bins of the histogram:

 

For 2 classes, minimizing the intra-class variance is equivalent to maximizing inter-class variance:

The following relations can be easily verified:

The class probabilities and class means can be computed iteratively. This idea
yields an effective algorithm.

Algorithm
 Compute histogram and probabilities of each intensity level
 Set up initial  and 
 Step through all possible thresholds  maximum intensity
 Update  and 
 Compute 
 Desired threshold corresponds to the maximum

MATLAB implementation
histogramCounts is a 256-element histogram of a grayscale image different gray-levels (typical for 8-bit images). 
level is the threshold for the image (double).

function level = otsu(histogramCounts)
total = sum(histogramCounts); % total number of pixels in the image 
%% OTSU automatic thresholding
top = 256;
sumB = 0;
wB = 0;
maximum = 0.0;
sum1 = dot(0:top-1, histogramCounts);
for ii = 1:top
    wF = total - wB;
    if wB > 0 && wF > 0
        mF = (sum1 - sumB) / wF;
        val = wB * wF * ((sumB / wB) - mF) * ((sumB / wB) - mF);
        if ( val >= maximum )
            level = ii;
            maximum = val;
        end
    end
    wB = wB + histogramCounts(ii);
    sumB = sumB + (ii-1) * histogramCounts(ii);
end
end

Matlab has built-in functions graythresh() and multithresh() in the Image Processing Toolbox which are implemented with Otsu's method and Multi Otsu's method, respectively.

Python implementation 
This implementation requires the NumPy library.import numpy as np

def compute_otsu_criteria(im, th):
    # create the thresholded image
    thresholded_im = np.zeros(im.shape)
    thresholded_im[im >= th] = 1

    # compute weights
    nb_pixels = im.size
    nb_pixels1 = np.count_nonzero(thresholded_im)
    weight1 = nb_pixels1 / nb_pixels
    weight0 = 1 - weight1

    # if one the classes is empty, eg all pixels are below or above the threshold, that threshold will not be considered
    # in the search for the best threshold
    if weight1 == 0 or weight0 == 0:
        return np.inf

    # find all pixels belonging to each class
    val_pixels1 = im[thresholded_im == 1]
    val_pixels0 = im[thresholded_im == 0]

    # compute variance of these classes
    var0 = np.var(val_pixels0) if len(val_pixels0) > 0 else 0
    var1 = np.var(val_pixels1) if len(val_pixels1) > 0 else 0

    return weight0 * var0 + weight1 * var1

im = # load your image as a numpy array.
# For testing purposes, one can use for example im = np.random.randint(0,255, size = (50,50))

# testing all thresholds from 0 to the maximum of the image
threshold_range = range(np.max(im)+1)
criterias = [compute_otsu_criteria(im, th) for th in threshold_range]

# best threshold is the one minimizing the Otsu criteria
best_threshold = threshold_range[np.argmin(criterias)]
    Python libraries dedicated to image processing such as OpenCV and Scikit-image propose built-in implementations of the algorithm.

Limitations and variations
Otsu's method performs well when the histogram has a  bimodal distribution with a deep and sharp valley between the two peaks.

Like all other global thresholding methods, Otsu's method performs badly in case of heavy noise, small objects size, inhomogeneous lighting and larger intra-class than inter-class variance. In those cases, local adaptations of the Otsu method have been developed.

Moreover, the mathematical grounding of Otsu's method models the histogram of the image as a mixture of two Normal distributions with equal variance and equal size. Otsu's thresholding may however yield satisfying results even when these assumptions are not met, in the same way statistical tests (to which Otsu's method is heavily connected) can perform correctly even when the working assumptions are not fully satisfied. However, several variations of Otsu's methods have been proposed to account for more severe deviations from these assumptions, such as the Kittler-Illingworth method.

A variation for noisy images 
A popular local adaptation is the two-dimensional Otsu's method, which performs better for the object segmentation task in noisy images. Here, the intensity value of a given pixel is compared with the average intensity of its immediate neighborhood to improve segmentation results.

At each pixel, the average gray-level value of the neighborhood is calculated. Let the gray level of the given pixel be divided into  discrete values and the average gray level is also divided into the same  values. Then a pair is formed: the pixel gray level and the average of the neighborhood . Each pair belongs to one of the  possible 2-dimensional bins. The total number of occurrences (frequency), of a pair , divided by the total number of pixels in the image , defines the joint probability mass function in a 2-dimensional histogram:

And the 2-dimensional Otsu's method is developed based on the 2-dimensional histogram as follows.

The probabilities of two classes can be denoted as: 

The intensity mean value vectors of two classes and total mean vector can be expressed as follows:

In most cases the probability off-diagonal will be negligible, so it is easy to verify:

The inter-class discrete matrix is defined as

The trace of the discrete matrix can be expressed as

where

Similar to one-dimensional Otsu's method, the optimal threshold  is obtained by maximizing .

Algorithm 

max,s,t = 0;
for ss: 0 to L-1 do
    for tt: 0 to L-1 do
        evaluate tr(S_b);
        if tr(S_b) > max
            max = tr(S,b);
            s = ss;
            t = tt;
        end if
    end for
end for
return s,t;

Notice that for evaluating , we can use a fast recursive dynamic programming algorithm to improve time performance. However, even with the dynamic programming approach, 2d Otsu's method still has large time complexity. Therefore, much research has been done to reduce the computation cost.

Note that if only coarse resolution is needed in terms of threshold, N_bins can be reduced.

MATLAB implementation 
function inputs and output:

hists is a  2D-histogram of grayscale value and neighborhood average grayscale value pair.

total is the number of pairs in the given image.it is determined by the number of the bins of 2D-histogram at each direction.

threshold is the threshold obtained.

function threshold = otsu_2D(hists, total)
maximum = 0.0;
threshold = 0;
helperVec = 0:255;
mu_t0 = sum(sum(repmat(helperVec',1,256).*hists));
mu_t1 = sum(sum(repmat(helperVec,256,1).*hists));
p_0 = zeros(256);
mu_i = p_0;
mu_j = p_0;
for ii = 1:256
    for jj = 1:256
        if jj == 1
            if ii == 1
                p_0(1,1) = hists(1,1);
            else
                p_0(ii,1) = p_0(ii-1,1) + hists(ii,1);
                mu_i(ii,1) = mu_i(ii-1,1)+(ii-1)*hists(ii,1);
                mu_j(ii,1) = mu_j(ii-1,1);
            end
        else
            p_0(ii,jj) = p_0(ii,jj-1)+p_0(ii-1,jj)-p_0(ii-1,jj-1)+hists(ii,jj); % THERE IS A BUG HERE. INDICES IN MATLAB MUST BE HIGHER THAN 0. ii-1 is not valid
            mu_i(ii,jj) = mu_i(ii,jj-1)+mu_i(ii-1,jj)-mu_i(ii-1,jj-1)+(ii-1)*hists(ii,jj);
            mu_j(ii,jj) = mu_j(ii,jj-1)+mu_j(ii-1,jj)-mu_j(ii-1,jj-1)+(jj-1)*hists(ii,jj);
        end

        if (p_0(ii,jj) == 0)
            continue;
        end
        if (p_0(ii,jj) == total)
            break;
        end
        tr = ((mu_i(ii,jj)-p_0(ii,jj)*mu_t0)^2 + (mu_j(ii,jj)-p_0(ii,jj)*mu_t1)^2)/(p_0(ii,jj)*(1-p_0(ii,jj)));

        if ( tr >= maximum )
            threshold = ii;
            maximum = tr;
        end
    end
end
end

A variation for unbalanced images 
When the levels of gray of the classes of the image can be considered as Normal distributions but with unequal size and/or unequal variances, assumptions for the Otsu algorithm are not met. The Kittler-Illingworth algorithm (also known as Minimum Error thresholding) is a variation of Otsu's method to handle such cases. There are several ways to mathematically describe this algorithm. One of them is to consider that for each threshold being tested, the parameters of the Normal distributions in the resulting binary image are estimated by Maximum likelihood estimation given the data.

While this algorithm could seem superior to Otsu's method, it introduces new parameters to be estimated, and this can result in the algorithm being over-parametrized and thus unstable. In many cases where the assumptions from Otsu's method seem at least partially valid, it may be preferable to favor Otsu's method over the Kittler-Illingworth algorithm, following Occam's razor.

Iterative Triclass Thresholding Based on the Otsu's Method 
One limitation of the Otsu’s method is that it cannot segment weak objects as the method searches for a single threshold to separate an image into two classes, namely, foreground and background, in one shot. Because the Otsu’s method looks to segment an image with one threshold, it tends to bias toward the class with the large variance. 
Iterative triclass thresholding algorithm is a variation of the Otsu’s method to circumvent this limitation. 
Given an image, at the first iteration, the triclass thresholding algorithm calculates a threshold  using the Otsu’s method. Based on threshold , the algorithm calculates mean  of pixels above  and mean  of pixels below . Then the algorithm tentatively separates the image into three classes (hence the name triclass), with the pixels above the upper mean  designated as the temporary foreground  class and pixels below the lower mean  designated as the temporary background  class. This completes the first iteration of the algorithm. For the second iteration, the Otsu’s method is applied to the TBD region only to obtain a new threshold . The algorithm then calculates the mean  of pixels in the TBD region that are above  and the mean  of pixels in the TBD region that are below . Pixels in the TBD region that are greater than the upper mean  are added to the temporary foreground . And pixels in the TBD region that are less than the lower mean  are added to the temporary background . This completes the second iteration. The algorithm then proceeds to the next iteration to process the new TBD region until it meets the stopping criterion. The criterion is that, when the difference between Otsu’s thresholds computed from two consecutive iterations is less than a small number, the iteration shall stop. For the last iteration, pixels above  are assigned to the foreground class and pixels below the threshold are assigned to the background class. At the end, all the temporary foreground pixels are combined to constitute the final foreground. All the temporary background pixels are combined to become the final background. In implementation, the algorithm involves no parameter except for the stopping criterion in terminating the iterations. By iteratively applying the Otsu’s method and gradually shrinking the TBD region for segmentation, the algorithm can obtain a result that preserves weak objects better than the standard Otsu’s method does.

References

External links
 Implementation of Otsu's thresholding method as GIMP-plugin using Script-Fu (a Scheme-based language)
 Lecture notes on thresholding – covers the Otsu method
 A plugin for ImageJ using Otsu's method to do the threshold
 A full explanation of Otsu's method with a working example and Java implementation
 Implementation of Otsu's method in ITK
 Otsu Thresholding in C# – a straightforward C# implementation with explanation
 Otsu's method using MATLAB
 Otsu Thresholding with scikit-image in Python

Image segmentation
Statistical deviation and dispersion